Great Big Boy is an album by American guitarist Leo Kottke, released in 1991.

History
Kottke's fifth album on the Private Music label, Great Big Boy is unique in the later Kottke canon in that every song includes a vocal part.  The disc consists of nine Kottke originals and a cover version of Johnny Cash's "I Still Miss Someone".  Complementing the often-oblique song lyrics is a strange short story included in the liner notes.

Margo Timmins' vocals were recorded by Peter Moore at MDI Productions, Toronto, Canada.

Though Kottke would not release another studio album until 1994, he was a frequent guest on various projects. He guested on Joshua Judges Ruth (1992) and I Love Everybody (1994) for Lyle Lovett, Troubadour (1992) by Larry Long, Other Voices, Other Rooms by Nanci Griffith, Traffic From Paradise by Rickie Lee Jones (both 1993) and Out of the Valley (1994) by John Gorka.

Great Big Boy was re-released on CD as a "twofer" with Peculiaroso by Acadia (8182) on Oct 29, 2007.

Reception

Writing for Allmusic, music critic Chip Renner wrote of the album "Kottke sings on this record to good effect."

Track listing
All songs by Leo Kottke except as noted.
 "Running Up the Stairs" – 3:16
 "The Other Day (near Santa Cruz)" – 2:55
 "Great Big Boy" – 3:40
 "Driver" – 3:34
 "Pepe Hush" – 3:43
 "Big Mob on the Hill" – 2:42
 "Ice Cream" – 4:36
 "Nothin' Works" – 2:54
 "Summer's Growing Old" – 2:53
 "I Still Miss Someone" (Johnny Cash, Roy Cash, Jr.) – 3:28

Personnel
Leo Kottke - guitar, vocals
Margo Timmins - backing vocals on 5
Lyle Lovett - backing vocals on 6, 7, 8
John Leftwich - bass 1, 3, 6, 8, 9, 10
Alejandro "Alex" Acuña - drums, percussion on 1, 2, 4, 5, 6, 7, 8
Robert Martin - keyboards on 1, 2, 4-8, 10; bass on 2, 5, 7, background vocals on 6
Victor Bisetti - drums & percussion on 3 & 10
Steve Kujala - flute on 3

Production notes
Produced by Steve Berlin
Recording Engineer: Paul duGre
Other engineers: Bob Schaper, Scott Stillman, Peter Moore
Mastered by Doug Sax & Alan Yoshida

References

External links
 Leo Kottke official site
 Unofficial Leo Kottke web site (fan site)

1991 albums
Leo Kottke albums
Private Music albums